Galliard Homes is a British residential property developer based in Loughton. Operating across London and the Home Counties, Galliard Homes is the capital's largest privately owned residential property developer.

History
Galliard Homes was founded in 1992, by Stephen Conway, who is still its chairman and stepped down as CEO in 2017. In 1993, Galliard Homes purchased the completed Papermill Wharf. Galliard's Victorian conversion, Burrells Wharf followed in 1994, including a statue of engineer Isambard Kingdom Brunel. Further developments in the Docklands include Great Jubilee Wharf, in Wapping, and Millennium Quay.

In 2011, together with Frogmore, Galliard acquired a site on Chiltern Street in Marylebone and began developing apartments, now known as The Chilterns.

Galliard appeared on BBC One's The Apprentice in December 2015, with contestants trying to sell off-plan apartments at The Printworks in Clapham.

In September 2016 Galliard's Lincoln Plaza development in London's Docklands won the Carbuncle Cup for the worst new building of the year in the UK.

Operations
With over 700 staff, Galliard is a property development, hospitality and management group overseeing mixed-use residential, hotel and commercial projects across London and southern England, with a £3.6 billion portfolio of over 6,000 homes, 950 hotel rooms, and one million square feet of retail premises and commercial properties.

Led by chairman and chief executive officer Stephen Conway, the Group has three divisions, Galliard Homes, Galliard Commercial and Galliard Construction.

In July 2015, Singaporean developer, Oxley Holdings entered into a subscription and shareholders' agreement to acquire a 20% stake in the enlarged share capital of Galliard for £50m.

The Stage, Shoreditch is among the projects under development by Galliard Homes.

A 1999 legal case, Galliard Homes v J Jarvis and Sons, is relevant to the interpretation of letters of intent, pre-contractual documents issued in order to set a project underway. In this case, the formal contract documents were never signed, and a dispute arose regarding the project. The High Court held that the intention of both parties had been to enter into a formal contract executed as a deed, but this did not take place and there was therefore no contract in place.

References

External links
 

Real estate companies established in 1992
1992 establishments in England
Companies based in Essex
Housebuilding companies of the United Kingdom
Property companies of the United Kingdom